Minnesota Lake is a lake in the U.S. state of Minnesota.

Minnesota Lake was named before the state of Minnesota itself; the name is derived from the Dakota language meaning "slightly whitish water".

See also
List of lakes in Minnesota

References

Lakes of Minnesota
Lakes of Blue Earth County, Minnesota
Lakes of Faribault County, Minnesota